Elachista melanthes is a moth of the family Elachistidae. It is found in the temperate areas of Australia, including south-western Western Australia, South Australia, the Australian Capital Territory and New South Wales.

The larvae feed on Lepidosperma semiteres. They mine the leaves of their host plant. The mine is filled with frass, except the distal . Pupation takes place outside of the mine on a leaf of the host plant.

References

melanthes
Moths described in 1887
Endemic fauna of Australia
Moths of Australia